Francesco Antonio Cicalese (active in Naples, 1642 -1685) was an Italian painter, mainly of still-life canvases. He was a pupil of Luca Forte.

References

Year of birth missing
Year of death missing
17th-century Italian painters
Italian male painters
Painters from Naples
Italian still life painters